Mangkunegara I, also known as Pangeran Sambernyawa ("Life Reaping Prince"), (born Raden Mas Said, 7 April 1725 – 1796) was the first ruler of Mangkunegaran in Java in the eighteenth century.

Personal life 

Mangkunegara was given the nickname "Life Reaping Prince" by Nicolaas Hartingh, because the prince had brought his enemies to death during the war. Hatingh was Dutch East India Company's Governor of the Northeast Coast of Java, located in Batavia.

He was born on 7 April 1726 in Kartasura. Mangkunegara was brought up by his mother, Raden Ayu Wulan and his father, Prince Mangkunegara Kartasura. His maternal grandfather was Prince Sambernyawa Balitar and his paternal grandfather was Amangkurat, King of Mataram.

Duke of Mangkunegara Kartasura

During the reign of the fourth amangkurat, the Kingdom of Mataram in Java was not free from the turmoil of civil war. Prince Mangkunegara replaced Pakubuwono I as King of Mataram, when the king had to face the uprising carried out by his two brothers, the prince and Prince Purbaya Blitar.

During this conflict, the Dutch gave full support to Prince Mangkunegara so that the two brothers could no longer carry out their rebellion.

The presence of Prince Mangkunegara instead of Pakubuwono had been prepared long before the death of the king. In March 1715, Mangkunegara Prince Arya (son of Pakubuwono I) was officially announced as the crown prince of the Kingdom of Mataram. In the same year, the appointment of crown prince was accompanied by the cannon shots of Gunturgeni, along with the ritual of cutting of the hair of the crown king.

Mangkunegara became the fourth amangkurat to rule Mataram. The title "mangkunegara" was later inherited by the eldest son, R.M. Suro who was then titled Prince Arya Mangkunegara Kartasura.

To quarantine the rivals, the king intended to marry his son to Prince Purbaya. The will of the king did not prevail due to resistance by Queen Amangkurat (his wife). His marriage was on condition of divorce from children Prince Prince Mangkunegara Blitar.

Amangkurat's story continues with the death due to poisoning and possible successor positions shifted to the younger brother of King RM Prabasuyasa.

References

Sources

 Soekanto, Dr., "About Djogjakarta" 1755-1825, Djakarta: Mahabharata, Amsterdam, 1952
 Anderson, BRO’G. The Idea of Power in Javanese Culture dalam Anderson, BRO’G. Language and Power: Exploring Political Cultures in Indonesia. Cornell University Press. 1990.
 
 Miksic, John N. (general ed.), et al. (2006) Karaton Surakarta. A look into the court of Surakarta Hadiningrat, central Java (First published: 'By the will of His Serene Highness Paku Buwono XII'. Surakarta: Yayasan Pawiyatan Kabudayan Karaton Surakarta, 2004) Marshall Cavendish Editions Singapore
 

Princes of Mangkunegaran
1725 births
1796 deaths
People from Surakarta
18th-century Indonesian people